Gay Man's Guide to Safer Sex is the name of a safer sex instructional documentary produced by Mike Esser and Tony Carne of Pride Video in association with the Terrence Higgins Trust in 1992. The film was directed by David Lewis and featured a soundtrack by John Balance and Peter Christopherson of Coil. The medical information included in the film is presented by Mike Youle, a British doctor specialising in HIV treatment. In 1997 a sequel was released, directed by Robert Falconer. Gay Man's Guide to Safer Sex '97 featured a radical recut of some of the original scenes asking the British Board of Film Classification to look again at what was permissible and becoming one of the first programmes to discuss the breakthrough of Triple Combination Therapy and the ramifications and personal experiences of living with HIV. The medical information and discussion was again led by Mike Youle. The 1997 film was released on retail video in the UK and USA and later on DVD. It is still in distribution on DVD.

The film won in the Best Special Interest Category in 1992's British Videogramme Association awards. Gay Man's Guide to Safer Sex '97 premiered to a sellout audience at the National Film Theatre on London's South Bank and was exhibited around the world on the international festival circuit.

Soundtrack
Coil provided the music. Some of the material is reworked, while some is exclusive to the movie. The track timings given represent the demo version and are in order of their chronological appearance in the film.
 "Theme from Gay Man's Guide to Safer Sex" – 8:13
 "Exploding Frogs" – 8:40
 "Nasa-Arab 2" – 4:12
 "Theme from Gay Man's Guide to Safer Sex Reconstruction" – 7:49
"Exploding Frogs" is a radically remixed version of "Omlagus Garfungiloops" from Stolen & Contaminated Songs.

The soundtrack was released officially on 28 June 2019, with the title The Gay Man's Guide to Safer Sex +2.

The tracklist also differs from the demo version, containing an alternative take of the theme and the original version of "Omlagus Garfungiloops":

 "Alternative Theme from Gay Man's Guide to Safer Sex 6:43
 "Exploding Frogs" – 8:41
 "Nasa-Arab 2" – 4:12
 "Nasa-Arab" – 10:59
 "Omlagus Garfungiloops" – 4:24
 "Theme from Gay Man's Guide to Safer Sex" – 8:35

References
 

Documentary films about HIV/AIDS
1992 films
1992 documentary films
British documentary films
British LGBT-related films
Documentary films about gay men
1992 LGBT-related films
HIV/AIDS in British films
1990s British films